Lithium is a chemical element with symbol Li and atomic number 3.

Lithium may also refer to:

In science 
Lithium (wasp), a genus of wasps
Lithium-ion battery, a battery used in electronics
Lithium (medication), mood-stabilizing drugs

In music 
"Lithium" (Evanescence song), a song from Evanescence's 2006 album The Open Door
"Lithium" (Nirvana song), a 1992 single from Nirvana's second album Nevermind
Lithium (Sirius XM), also known as Lithium 34, a 1990s alternative music station offered by SIRIUS Satellite Radio
 Lithium (label), a defunct indie-rock French label

Other 
Lithium Technologies, an online customer support and brand loyalty company
Lithium, Missouri, a village in the United States
Lithium (PHP framework), a PHP framework inspired and staffed by some members of the CakePHP project

See also

 Li (disambiguation)
 Isotopes of lithium